is a railway station in the town of Tatsuno, Kamiina District, Nagano Prefecture, Japan jointly operated by JR Central and JR East. It is managed by JR East. The station also has a freight terminal for the Japan Freight Railway Company (JR Freight).

Lines
Tatsuno Station is served by the old route of Chūō Main Line  (Okaya-Shiojiri branch)  and is 9.5 kilometers from the branching point of the line at Okaya Station and 219.9 from the terminus at Tokyo Station. It is also a station on the Iida Line, and is 195.7 kilometers from the terminus of that line at Toyohashi Station

Station layout
The station consists of two ground-level island platforms serving four tracks, connected to the station building by a footbridge. The station has a Midori no Madoguchi staffed ticket office.

Platforms

History
The station opened on 11 June 1906. The current station building was completed in 1983. With the privatization of Japanese National Railways (JNR) on 1 April 1987, the station came under the control of JR East.

Passenger statistics
In fiscal 2017,  the  station was used by an average of 611 passengers daily (boarding passengers only).

Surrounding area
Tatsuno Post Office
Tenryū River

See also
 List of railway stations in Japan

References

External links

 JR East station information 

Railway stations in Nagano Prefecture
Chūō Main Line
Iida Line
Railway stations in Japan opened in 1906
Stations of East Japan Railway Company
Stations of Central Japan Railway Company
Stations of Japan Freight Railway Company
Tatsuno, Nagano